HyperTransport (HT), formerly known as Lightning Data Transport, is a technology for interconnection of computer processors.  It is a bidirectional serial/parallel high-bandwidth, low-latency point-to-point link that was introduced on April 2, 2001.  The HyperTransport Consortium is in charge of promoting and developing HyperTransport technology.

HyperTransport is best known as the system bus architecture of AMD central processing units (CPUs) from Athlon 64 through AMD FX and the associated motherboard chipsets. HyperTransport has also been used by IBM and Apple for the Power Mac G5 machines, as well as a number of modern MIPS systems.

The current specification HTX 3.1 remained competitive for 2014 high-speed (2666 and 3200 MT/s or about 10.4 GB/s and 12.8 GB/s) DDR4 RAM and slower (around 1 GB/s  similar to high end PCIe SSDs ULLtraDIMM flash RAM) technology—a wider range of RAM speeds on a common CPU bus than any Intel front-side bus.  Intel technologies require each speed range of RAM to have its own interface, resulting in a more complex motherboard layout but with fewer bottlenecks.  HTX 3.1 at 26 GB/s can serve as a unified bus for as many as four DDR4 sticks running at the fastest proposed speeds. Beyond that DDR4 RAM may require two or more HTX 3.1 buses diminishing its value as unified transport.

Overview

Links and rates 
HyperTransport comes in four versions—1.x, 2.0, 3.0, and 3.1—which run from 200MHz to 3.2 GHz. It is also a DDR or "double data rate" connection, meaning it sends data on both the rising and falling edges of the clock signal. This allows for a maximum data rate of 6400 MT/s when running at 3.2 GHz. The operating frequency is autonegotiated with the motherboard chipset (North Bridge) in current computing.

HyperTransport supports an autonegotiated bit width, ranging from 2 to 32 bits per link; there are two unidirectional links per HyperTransport bus.  With the advent of version 3.1, using full 32-bit links and utilizing the full HyperTransport 3.1 specification's operating frequency, the theoretical transfer rate is 25.6 GB/s (3.2 GHz × 2 transfers per clock cycle × 32 bits per link) per direction, or 51.2 GB/s aggregated throughput, making it faster than most existing bus standard for PC workstations and servers as well as making it faster than most bus standards for high-performance computing and networking.

Links of various widths can be mixed together in a single system configuration as in one 16-bit link to another CPU and one 8-bit link to a peripheral device, which allows for a wider interconnect between CPUs, and a lower bandwidth interconnect to peripherals as appropriate. It also supports link splitting, where a single 16-bit link can be divided into two 8-bit links.  The technology also typically has lower latency than other solutions due to its lower overhead.

Electrically, HyperTransport is similar to low-voltage differential signaling (LVDS) operating at 1.2 V. HyperTransport 2.0 added post-cursor transmitter deemphasis.  HyperTransport 3.0 added scrambling and receiver phase alignment as well as optional transmitter precursor deemphasis.

Packet-oriented
HyperTransport is packet-based, where each packet consists of a set of 32-bit words, regardless of the physical width of the link. The first word in a packet always contains a command field. Many packets contain a 40-bit address. An additional 32-bit control packet is prepended when 64-bit addressing is required. The data payload is sent after the control packet. Transfers are always padded to a multiple of 32 bits, regardless of their actual length.

HyperTransport packets enter the interconnect in segments known as bit times. The number of bit times required depends on the link width.  HyperTransport also supports system management messaging, signaling interrupts, issuing probes to adjacent devices or processors, I/O transactions, and general data transactions.  There are two kinds of write commands supported: posted and non-posted. Posted writes do not require a response from the target. This is usually used for high bandwidth devices such as uniform memory access traffic or direct memory access transfers. Non-posted writes require a response from the receiver in the form of a "target done" response. Reads also require a response, containing the read data. HyperTransport supports the PCI consumer/producer ordering model.

Power-managed 
HyperTransport also facilitates power management as it is compliant with the Advanced Configuration and Power Interface specification. This means that changes in processor sleep states (C states) can signal changes in device states (D states), e.g. powering off disks when the CPU goes to sleep.  HyperTransport 3.0 added further capabilities to allow a centralized power management controller to implement power management policies.

Applications

Front-side bus replacement 
The primary use for HyperTransport is to replace the Intel-defined front-side bus, which is different for every type of Intel processor.  For instance, a Pentium cannot be plugged into a PCI Express bus directly, but must first go through an adapter to expand the system. The proprietary front-side bus must connect through adapters for the various standard buses, like AGP or PCI Express. These are typically included in the respective controller functions, namely the northbridge and southbridge.

In contrast, HyperTransport is an open specification, published by a multi-company consortium. A single HyperTransport adapter chip will work with a wide spectrum of HyperTransport enabled microprocessors.

AMD used HyperTransport to replace the front-side bus  in their Opteron, Athlon 64, Athlon II, Sempron 64, Turion 64, Phenom, Phenom II and FX families of microprocessors.

Multiprocessor interconnect 
Another use for HyperTransport is as an interconnect for NUMA multiprocessor computers. AMD used HyperTransport with a proprietary cache coherency extension as part of their Direct Connect Architecture in their Opteron and Athlon 64 FX (Dual Socket Direct Connect (DSDC) Architecture) line of processors. Infinity Fabric used with the EPYC server CPUs is a superset of HyperTransport. The HORUS interconnect from Newisys extends this concept to larger clusters. The Aqua device from 3Leaf Systems virtualizes and interconnects CPUs, memory, and I/O.

Router or switch bus replacement 
HyperTransport can also be used as a bus in routers and switches. Routers and switches have multiple network interfaces, and must forward data between these ports as fast as possible. For example, a four-port, 1000 Mbit/s Ethernet router needs a maximum 8000 Mbit/s of internal bandwidth (1000 Mbit/s × 4 ports × 2 directions)—HyperTransport greatly exceeds the bandwidth this application requires. However a 4 + 1 port 10 Gb router would require 100 Gbit/s of internal bandwidth. Add to that 802.11ac 8 antennas and the WiGig 60 GHz standard (802.11ad) and HyperTransport becomes more feasible (with anywhere between 20 and 24 lanes used for the needed bandwidth).

Co-processor interconnect 
The issue of latency and bandwidth between CPUs and co-processors has usually been the major stumbling block to their practical implementation. Co-processors such as FPGAs have appeared that can access the HyperTransport bus and become integrated on the motherboard. Current generation FPGAs from both main manufacturers (Altera and Xilinx) directly support the HyperTransport interface, and have IP Cores available.  Companies such as XtremeData, Inc. and DRC take these FPGAs (Xilinx in DRC's case) and create a module that allows FPGAs to plug directly into the Opteron socket.

AMD started an initiative named Torrenza on September 21, 2006 to further promote the usage of HyperTransport for plug-in cards and coprocessors.  This initiative opened their "Socket F" to plug-in boards such as those from XtremeData and DRC.

Add-on card connector (HTX and HTX3) 

A connector specification that allows a slot-based peripheral to have direct connection to a microprocessor using a HyperTransport interface was released by the HyperTransport Consortium.  It is known as HyperTransport eXpansion (HTX).  Using a reversed instance of the same mechanical connector as a 16-lane PCI Express slot (plus an x1 connector for power pins), HTX allows development of plug-in cards that support direct access to a CPU and DMA to the system RAM. The initial card for this slot was the QLogic InfiniPath InfiniBand HCA. IBM and HP, among others, have released HTX compliant systems.

The original HTX standard is limited to 16bits and 800MHz.

In August 2008, the HyperTransport Consortium released HTX3, which extends the clock rate of HTX to 2.6 GHz (5.2 GT/s, 10.7 GTi, 5.2 real GHz data rate, 3 MT/s edit rate) and retains backwards compatibility.

Testing 
The "DUT" test connector is defined to enable standardized functional test system interconnection.

Implementations 
 AMD AMD64 and Direct Connect Architecture based CPUs
 AMD chipsets
 AMD-8000 series
 AMD 480 series
 AMD 580 series
 AMD 690 series
 AMD 700 series
 AMD 800 series
 AMD 900 series
 ATI chipsets
 ATI Radeon Xpress 200 for AMD processor
 ATI Radeon Xpress 3200 for AMD processor
 Broadcom (then ServerWorks) HyperTransport SystemI/O controllers
 HT-2000
 HT-2100
 Cisco QuantumFlow Processors
 ht_tunnel from OpenCores project (MPL licence)
 IBM CPC925 and CPC945 (PowerPC 970 northbridges) chipsets
 Loongson-3 MIPS processor
 Nvidia nForce chipsets
 nForce Professional MCPs (Media and Communication Processor)
 nForce 3 series
 nForce 4 series
 nForce 500 series
 nForce 600 series
 nForce 700 series
 nForce 900 series
 PMC-Sierra RM9000X2 MIPS CPU
 Power Mac G5
 Raza Thread Processors
 SiByte MIPS CPUs from Broadcom
 Transmeta TM8000 Efficeon CPUs
 VIA chipsets K8 series

Frequency specifications 

* AMD Athlon 64, Athlon 64 FX, Athlon 64 X2, Athlon X2, Athlon II, Phenom, Phenom II, Sempron, Turion series and later use one 16-bit HyperTransport link.  AMD Athlon 64 FX (1207), Opteron use up to three 16-bit HyperTransport links.  Common clock rates for these processor links are 800 MHz to 1 GHz (older single and multi socket systems on 754/939/940 links) and 1.6 GHz to 2.0 GHz (newer single socket systems on AM2+/AM3 links—most newer CPUs using 2.0GHz). While HyperTransport itself is capable of 32-bit width links, that width is not currently utilized by any AMD processors.  Some chipsets though do not even utilize the 16-bit width used by the processors.  Those include the Nvidia nForce3 150, nForce3 Pro 150, and the ULi M1689—which use a 16-bit HyperTransport downstream link but limit the HyperTransport upstream link to 8 bits.

Name 
There has been some marketing confusion between the use of HT referring to HyperTransport and the later use of HT to refer to Intel's Hyper-Threading feature on some Pentium 4-based and the newer Nehalem and Westmere-based Intel Core microprocessors. Hyper-Threading is officially known as Hyper-Threading Technology (HTT) or HT Technology. Because of this potential for confusion, the HyperTransport Consortium always uses the written-out form: "HyperTransport."

Infinity Fabric 
Infinity Fabric (IF) is a superset of HyperTransport announced by AMD in 2016 as an interconnect for its GPUs and CPUs. It is also usable as interchip interconnect for communication between CPUs and GPUs (for Heterogeneous System Architecture), an arrangement known as Infinity Architecture. The company said the Infinity Fabric would scale from 30GB/s to 512GB/s, and be used in the Zen-based CPUs and Vega GPUs which were subsequently released in 2017.

On Zen and Zen+ CPUs, the "SDF" data interconnects are run at the same frequency as the DRAM memory clock (MEMCLK), a decision made to remove the latency caused by different clock speeds. As a result, using a faster RAM module makes the entire bus faster.  The links are 32-bit wide, as in HT, but 8 transfers are done per cycle (128-bit packets) compared to the original 2. Electrical changes are made for higher power efficiency. On Zen 2 and Zen 3 CPUs, the IF bus is on a separate clock, either in a 1:1 or 2:1 ratio to the DRAM clock, because of Zen's early problems with high-speed DRAM affecting IF speed, and therefore system stability. The bus width has also been doubled.

See also 
 Elastic interface bus
 Fibre Channel
 Front-side bus
 Intel QuickPath Interconnect
 List of device bandwidths
 PCI Express
 RapidIO
 AGESA

References

External links 
 
 .
 
 

Computer buses
Macintosh internals
Serial buses